And the Crows Will Dig Your Grave is a 1971 Spanish western film directed by Juan Bosch and starring Craig Hill, Fernando Sancho and Dominique Boschero. It is composed by Bruno Nicolai.

Cast
 Craig Hill as Jeff Sullivan
 Fernando Sancho as Pancho Corrales
 Maria Pia Conte as Susan
 Frank Brana as Glenn Kovac
 Dominique Boschero as Myra
 Raf Baldassarre as Sheriff of Silver Town
 Joaquín Díaz as Ted Salomon
 Carlos Ronda as Sheriff of Lost Valley
 Antonio Molino Rojo as El Rojo
 Juan Torres as Manuel
 Indio González as Corrales' Man
 Ivano Staccioli as Donovan
 Ángel Aranda as Dan Barker
 José Antonio Amor as Jerry
 Raúl Aparici as Emisario
 Manuel Bronchud as Mejicano
 Fernando de Miragaya as García
 Loredana Montiel as Rosita
 Ricardo Moyán as Dawson
 Isidro Novellas as Capitán del campo de trabajo

References

External links
 

Spanish Western (genre) films
Films directed by Juan Bosch
Films scored by Bruno Nicolai
Warner Bros. films
1971 Western (genre) films
1971 films